Vatsvatnet is a lake in the municipality of Vindafjord in Rogaland county, Norway. The  lake lies south of the European route E134 highway and north of the village of Vats. The primary outflow of the lake is the river Åmselva which flows south into the Vatsfjorden.

See also
List of lakes in Norway

References

Vindafjord
Lakes of Rogaland